Susan B. Glasser (born January 14, 1969) is an American journalist and news editor. She writes the online column "Letter from Biden’s Washington" in The New Yorker, where she is a staff writer. She is the author, with her husband Peter Baker, of Kremlin Rising: Vladimir Putin's Russia and the End of Revolution (2005), The Man Who Ran Washington: The Life and Times of James A. Baker III (2020), and The Divider: Trump in the White House, 2017-2021 (2022).

Early life 
Glasser is the daughter of Lynn (née Schreiber) and Stephen Glasser. Her parents are the founders of a weekly legal newspaper, Legal Times, and a legal and business publishing company, Glasser Legal Works. Her grandfather, Melvin Glasser, supervised the field trials for the polio vaccine. Glasser was graduated cum laude from Harvard University, where she wrote for The Harvard Crimson.

Career 
Glasser interned, and later worked for eight years at Roll Call. In 1998, Glasser started at The Washington Post, where she spent a decade. She edited the Post's Sunday Outlook and national news sections, helped oversee coverage of Bill Clinton's impeachment, covered the wars in Iraq and in Afghanistan, and served as Moscow bureau co-chief with her husband, Peter Baker.

She was editor-in-chief of Foreign Policy until 2013. Glasser then joined Politico, and served as editor during the 2016 election cycle. She also was the founding editor of Politico Magazine, a long-form publication both online and in print.

Works

Personal life 
In September 2000, she married Peter Baker in a civil ceremony. Her husband is the chief White House correspondent for The New York Times. Baker and Glasser live in Washington.

Their son, Theo Baker, became the youngest person to win a Polk Award after reporting he performed at the age of eighteen regarding allegations that some research papers by Marc Tessier-Lavigne, the president of Stanford University, had manipulated images.

References

External links 

 
 Letter from Biden's Washington columns from newyorker.com
Letter from Trump's Washington columns from newyorker.com

Living people
Place of birth missing (living people)
The Washington Post people
American political journalists
Jewish American journalists
The New Yorker staff writers
1969 births
21st-century American Jews
The Harvard Crimson people